The Armstrong Twins were a bluegrass and country duo consisting of the twins Floyd and Lloyd Armstrong. They were born on January 24, 1930, in De Witt, Arkansas to a musical family, and active mostly in the 1940s and 1950s.

They were one of several brother duos of their era, of which they were the only twins. Initially they both played guitar; but after randomly picking an instrument at a pawn shop in 1938 at his father's behest ("It's a wonder I didn't pick a tuba"), Lloyd started to play the mandolin and sing harmony, while Floyd played the guitar and sang lead.

Their biggest hit is the Mandolin Boogie. They became active again in the 1980s.

References

External links
Obituary for Floyd and Lloyd's mother Lois. Mentions that both her sons died before her death in 2006.
Photo of Floyd's gravestone in Grapevine, Arkansas.
Musical Traditions: The Armstrong Twins
Biography from Country Music Television

1930 births
People from DeWitt, Arkansas
Country music duos
Apex Records artists
American bluegrass music groups
American mandolinists
American bluegrass guitarists
American bluegrass mandolinists
1999 deaths
20th-century American guitarists
20th-century American singers
American male guitarists
Country musicians from Arkansas
20th-century American male singers
1994 deaths